Delias nigrina, the black Jezebel or common Jezebel (also used for Delias eucharis), is a butterfly in the family Pieridae. It is found along the eastern seaboard of Australia, from Queensland, through New South Wales to Victoria.

The wingspan of both the male and the female is 56 mm.

The upper sides of the males are white with black tips containing white spots on the forewings, and narrow black margins around the hindwings. The females on top are grey with wide black edges, which contain white spots near the apex of the forewings.

The larvae feed on Amyema cambagei, Amyema congener, Amyema miquelii, Amyema quandang, Dendrophthoe curvata, Dendrophthoe glabrescens, Dendrophthoe vitellina, Muellerina celastroides and Muellerina eucalyptoides.

Gallery

References

External links
Australian Insects
Australian Faunal Directory
Delias nigrina markings

nigrina
Butterflies described in 1775
Butterflies of Australia
Taxa named by Johan Christian Fabricius